Dinarak (Al-Mutakamilah for Payments Services via Mobile Phone) is a mobile wallet, money transfer, electronic bill payment, funds disbursement service, licensed by the Central Bank of Jordan under the JoMoPay national switch and launched in late 2015 as Dinarak wallet as part of the Jordanian central bank's efforts to advocate financial inclusion for the un-banked segment of the Jordanian population. Dinarak allows users to deposit, withdraw, transfer money and pay for goods and services via their mobile phone. The service can be accessed by Dinarak mobile application.

JoMoPay, the Jordanian national mobile payments switch, is a unique payment system that has created cross-platform and platform level interoperability for multiple digital payments instruments in Jordan. This includes interoperability between the licensed mobile payment services providers as well as interoperability between mobile wallets, bank accounts, and prepaid cards.

Services 

Dinarak customers can deposit as well as withdraw money from a network of agents that includes many retail outlets, the post office and Exchange houses acting as banking agents. Dinarak offers mobile money solutions including:

 Salary/Funds disbursement 
 Peer-peer money transfer
Mobile-to-mobile
Mobile-to-prepaid card
Mobile-to-bank account (and vice versa)
 Bill/Merchant payment
 National money transfer
 Mobile recharge plus Efawateercom access which is the national bill payment and presentment portal
 E-Commerce payment
 Cash-in/Cash-out services across Jordan
Dinarak branches
Exchange houses
Post office branches
Automated teller machines
Dinarak agents
 Cardless automated teller machine withdrawals via one-time password
 Cardless purchases via one-time password at any of the partner point of sale machines at merchants across the country.
 PrePaid MC Card refills from Dinarak mobile application
 Manual merchant payment via Merchant Alias 
 Manual merchant payment via scanning of QC code
 NFC payment availability for low ticket items via near-field communication passive sticker

Registering for your Dinarak account requires visit a Dinarak Agent or Dinarak Branch with your national identification, filling in a form and activating your Dinarak App.

Non-Jordanians can use their passport (or United Nations High Commissioner for Refugees card) for registration and Know Your Customer requirements set forth by Central Bank of Jordan.

Transaction charges and costs

 No fees when using Dinarak MasterCard at Jordan Kuwait Bank ATMs
 No fees for receiving money
 Paying for goods and services
 Cardless automated teller machine withdrawals at Cairo Amman Bank 
 No fees for making payments to retailers and merchants
 Bill payments / eFAWATEERCOM: free (no fees are added by Dinarak)
 Free account opening 
 No minimum balance   
 No monthly fees

See also

Digital currency

References 

Payment systems
Banking technology
E-commerce in Jordan
Mobile payments